Kendrick is an unincorporated community in the U.S. state of Mississippi, in Alcorn County. A post office operated under the name Kendrick from 1889 to 1943.

References

Unincorporated communities in Alcorn County, Mississippi